Awesometown may refer to:
Valencia, Santa Clarita, California, branded as "Awesometown", a neighborhood in the United States
Awesometown, a 2005 TV pilot by The Lonely Island